The sixth season of the Brazilian version of the reality television show De Férias com o Ex, premiered on MTV on May 21, 2020.

The season featured the return of Matheus Crivella, this time, as an original cast member following his appearance in the fourth season of the show as an ex. Scarlat Cióla also made her return to the series having first appeared during the second season.

The season was filmed in Jericoacoara, Ceará from January 28 to February 20, 2020.

It is the first season to feature openly LGBT male cast members (openly bisexual females have been part of the show since the first season).

However, through the airing of the season, MTV has come under criticism by media, viewers and cast members for censoring same-sex scenes from the episodes, while mixed-sex couples were left uncensored. First in episode 6, when Rafa Vieira and Jarlles Góis spent the night together in one of the bedrooms, and then, a second time on episode 9 when Jarlles Góis and Leo Lacerda went to the Suite Master.

The incident was followed by accusations of double standard, homophobia and questioning of the network's social activism authenticity (as episode 6 was first broadcast on June 25, 2020, during the LGBT Pride Month, heavily promoted and celebrated during the commercial breaks of MTV's  programming). After a series of complaints from the public, intimate scenes between Léo Lacerda and Matheus Magalhães were shown uncensored during episodes 10 and 11.

Cast 
The official list of cast members were released on February 14, 2020. They included five boys: Caio Cabral, Igor Adamovich, João Hadad, Matheus Crivella and Rafael Vieira, and five girls: Bárbara Morais, Flávia Caroline, Jéssica Marisol, Mayara Cardoso and Mina Winkel.

Bold indicates original cast member; all other cast were brought into the series as an ex.

Duration of cast 

 Key:  Cast member is featured in this episode
 Key:  Cast member arrives on the beach
 Key:  Cast member has an ex arrive on the beach
 Key:  Cast member has two exes arrive on the beach
 Key:  Cast member arrives on the beach and has an ex arrive during the same episode
 Key:  Cast member leaves the beach
 Key:  Cast member has an ex arrive on the beach and leaves during the same episode
 Key:  Cast member arrives on the beach and leaves during the same episode
 Key:  Cast member does not feature in this episode

Future Appearances

In 2022, João Hadad appeared with his girlfriend Luana Andrade in Power Couple Brasil 6, they finished in 4th place in the competition.

Guest appearances 
 Episode 7 
 Regina Adamovich (Igor's mother)
 Episode 9 
 Kevin o Chris
 Episode 11 
 MC Rebecca
 Episode 12 
 Matuê

References

External links 
Official website 

De Férias com o Ex seasons
2020 Brazilian television seasons
Ex on the Beach